Anne Beauchamp, 16th Countess of Warwick (13 July 1426 – 20 September 1492) was an important late medieval English noblewoman. She was the daughter of Richard Beauchamp, 13th Earl of Warwick, and his second wife, Isabel le Despenser (a daughter of Thomas le Despenser (22 September 1373 – 13 January 1399/1400) and Constance of York). 

Anne Beauchamp was the mother of two famous daughters, Isabel Neville, the royal Duchess of Clarence, and Anne Neville, Queen consort of England as the spouse of King Richard III.

Inheritance
Anne Beauchamp was born at Caversham Castle in Oxfordshire (now Berkshire). She married Richard Neville 'the Kingmaker' – and her brother Henry Beauchamp married Richard's sister Cecily – in 1436. Following the death of Anne's father in 1439, and subsequently that of her brother Henry in 1446, and his infant daughter Lady Anne in 1449, Neville inherited the title and the considerable estates of the Earldom of Warwick through his wife.

However, this was contested by Anne's three older half-sisters, children of her father's first marriage to Elizabeth, heir of Berkeley. One of these, Lady Eleanor, was married to Edmund Beaufort, 2nd Duke of Somerset (killed at the First Battle of St Albans in 1455). The litigation over the Warwick inheritance only fuelled the enmity between this branch of the Nevilles and the Beauforts who were closely related. Anne Beauchamp's husband, Richard, was the grandson of Lady Joan Beaufort, Countess of Westmorland, sister of the Duke's late father. Law considered that Anne Beauchamp being a full-blooded aunt of the last countess was more eligible to inherit than her older half-sisters, who were thus not coheirs with her, including the eldest – Lady Margaret, Countess of Shrewsbury (d. 1468). Richard Neville succeeded in keeping the Warwick and Despencer estates intact.

Children's marriages

Her elder daughter, Lady Isabel, married George, Duke of Clarence, the younger brother of King Edward IV of England. Her younger daughter, Lady Anne Neville, was married to Edward of Westminster, the only son of King Henry VI. When Edward of Westminster was killed in the Battle of Tewkesbury, Anne Neville was married to Richard, Duke of Gloucester, later King Richard III of England. Although their mother was still living, the husbands of the two Neville sisters fought over their inheritance. To win his brother George's final consent to the marriage with Anne, eventually Richard renounced most of Warwick's land and property including the earldoms of Warwick (which the Kingmaker had held in his wife's right) and Salisbury and surrendered to Clarence the office of Great Chamberlain of England. 

In 1474, to settle the dispute once and for all, Anne was declared legally dead by Parliament and her inheritance divided between her two daughters. 

After George was executed for treason in 1478, his son Edward inherited the title of Earl of Warwick, while Richard's son was styled Earl of Salisbury.

Later life
Anne died in obscurity, having survived her husband, her daughters and the sons-in-law who had effectively disinherited her. She was in sanctuary at Beaulieu Abbey in 1486 when she petitioned Henry VII for the return of her estate. She recovered a small portion, but only on condition that she broke the entail and remit the bulk of them to Henry VII. "The 'Warwick and Spencer lands', her own patrimony became part of the crown estate."

Fictional portrayals
Anne, Countess of Warwick, appears prominently in the Philippa Gregory novels The White Queen (2009), The Red Queen (2010), and The Kingmaker's Daughter (2012), and is played by Juliet Aubrey in the 2013 television adaptation of all three novels, The White Queen. She is depicted as a coldly ambitious mother to Isabel and Anne Neville, and her husband's staunchest supporter.

A more sympathetic portrayal of the Countess of Warwick is in the novel The Sunne in Splendour by Sharon Kay Penman, and a maternal view of her is observed in The Reluctant Queen by Jean Plaidy. 

Novelist Sandra Worth represents the Countess as her husband's conscience in her five novels about the Wars of the Roses. Another sympathetic portrayal of Anne Beauchamp is Wife to the Kingmaker, a 1974 title by Sandra Wilson.

Ancestry

References

1426 births
1492 deaths
15th-century English nobility
Anne
15th-century English women
Daughters of British earls
Wives of knights
Neville
English countesses
Hereditary women peers
People from Caversham, Reading
Women of the Tudor period
Place of death missing
Lords of Glamorgan